Joseph Oliver Bowers, SVD (28 March 1910 – 5 November 2012) was a prelate of the Catholic Church from Dominica, who served as Bishop of St. Johns -Basseterre from 1971 to 1981. He previously served as Bishop of Accra on the then Gold Coast beginning in 1953. He was the first Black Catholic bishop to be consecrated in the United States in the 20th century, and the first ever to ordain African-American Catholic priests.

He is credited with having tripled the Catholic population and parishes in Ghana and for substantially increasing the number of Catholic priests and religious laity in the Diocese of Accra. At the time of his death in Ghana, aged 102, he was the second-oldest Catholic bishop and the oldest from the Caribbean.

Biography
Bowers was born in Dominica, to Sheriff Montague Bowers (originally from Antigua) and his wife Mary. He was educated at the Dominica Grammar School, before traveling to the United States to attend St. Augustine Seminary, in Bay St. Louis, Mississippi. He was ordained on 22 January 1939, and continued as a priest in the Society of the Divine Word. He was then appointed Auxiliary Bishop of Accra in Ghana and Titular Bishop of Cyparissia. Bowers was appointed Bishop of Accra on 8 January 1953, and received his episcopal consecration on 22 April 1953 from Cardinal Francis Spellman at the Church of Our Lady of the Gulf in Bay St. Louis, becoming the first openly Black bishop consecrated in the United States.

In 1957 Bowers founded the Handmaids of the Divine Redeemer (HDR) in Accra, which was dedicated to caring and comforting the poor. He was also the founder of St John’s Seminary and College, known as of 2012 as Pope John Senior High School and Minor Seminary.

Bowers attended the Second Vatican Council from 1962 to 1965, along with some 3,000 bishops from around the world.

In recognition and acknowledgement of his work in Ghana, when the diocese of St. John's-Basseterre was created in the West Indies in 1971 – comprising the islands of Antigua and Barbuda, Saint Kitts and Nevis, Montserrat, Anguilla and the British Virgin Islands – Bowers was appointed its first bishop on 16 January 1971, becoming the chief pastor in Antigua. On 17 July 1981, he retired from Church office and, after some years spent in Charlestown, Nevis, returned to Dominica, where he lived in Mahaut in the care of his sister.

In the 1990s the HDR Sisters, some of whom had periodically visited him in Dominica, invited him back to Ghana, where they cared for him in the town of Agomanya. At the celebrations there for his 100th birthday, a guest was Nicholas Liverpool, president of Dominica.

Bowers died at the age of 102 on 5 November 2012, in Agomanya in the Eastern Region of Ghana. He was buried at the Holy Spirit Cathedral in Accra.

See also

Parish of St Sylvanus, Pokuase

References

External links
Wendell Lawrence, "Bishop Joseph Oliver Bowers", Dominica Academy of Arts and Sciences, July 2007.

1910 births
2012 deaths
Antigua and Barbuda Roman Catholic bishops
Saint Kitts and Nevis Roman Catholic bishops
Catholic Church in the Caribbean
Participants in the Second Vatican Council
20th-century Roman Catholic bishops in Ghana
Dominica centenarians
Men centenarians
Divine Word Missionaries Order
Dominica people of Antigua and Barbuda descent
Roman Catholic bishops of Saint John's–Basseterre
Roman Catholic bishops of Accra
Dominica Roman Catholics
Dominica bishops
St. Augustine Seminary (Bay St. Louis)